Amphibulima pardalina is a species of  tropical air-breathing land snail, a pulmonate gastropod mollusk in the family Amphibulimidae.

Distribution 
Amphibulima pardalina is endemic to Dominica. The type locality is Mount Kuliabon and Morne Diablotin, Dominica.

Amphibulima pardalina is very restricted in range and probably meet the IUCN-criteria of Critically Endangered species. This species is restricted to higher localities.

Description 
This rare species, considered by Henry Augustus Pilsbry (1899) to be distinct on account of its coarse sculpture, can be found both as a light and a dark colour form.

Ecology 
It was found in very damp and cool habitats in cloud forest at higher altitudes.

References
This article incorporates CC-BY-3.0 text from the reference 

Amphibulimidae
Endemic fauna of Dominica
Gastropods described in 1868